(stylized as GoödFeël) is a Japanese video game developer. Good-Feel started in Hyogo, Japan in 2005 and opened a production facility in Tokyo in the same year. Their main focus had been educational games for the Nintendo DS, which were released solely in Japan. The games, the first of which was released in 2007, consist of primers for young children (kindergarten and below) and English language training for kids and adults.

In 2008, the company became the developer for the Wii game, Wario Land: Shake It!, published by Nintendo, which marked Good-Feel's first entry into the home console market.

History
Good-Feel was founded by the former Konami employee, Etsunobu Ebisu, on October 3, 2005. He told Nintendo about the new company and asked if they could work on a game. Long-time Nintendo employee Takahiro Harada asked Ebisu if he would like to make a new Wario Land title, since Harada learned before the meeting that Ebisu was involved in the development of a Nintendo DS platform game he enjoyed very much, and Harada always wanted to make a Wario Land sequel. Though Ebisu suggested a shooting game, he agreed to create a platform game after Harada convinced him. The development resulted in Wario Land: Shake It!, a 2D platform game released in 2008 with hand-drawn graphics made with the help of the animation studios Production I.G and Kusanagi. They later made the 2010 game Kirby's Epic Yarn, a unique entry into the Kirby franchise.

In October 2019, Good-Feel announced Monkey Barrels, their first self-published game and their first game in over a decade to not be published by Nintendo. Monkey Barrels was released in November 2019 for Nintendo Switch. A Microsoft Windows version was released on February 9, 2021.

Games developed

See also
Suzak
8ing
Nd Cube
Dimps
TOSE

Further reading
Good-feel Talk Wario Land
Meet the brains behind Wario Land

References

http://n-styles.com/main/archives/2008/10/28-080000.php

The initial version of this article was partly based on the article Good-Feel from the external wiki Super Mario Wiki, released under the GFDL by its authors.

External links
 

Amusement companies of Japan
Video game companies established in 2005
Japanese companies established in 2005
Video game companies of Japan
Video game development companies
Companies based in Kobe